Parigny may refer to the following places in France:

 Parigny, Loire, a commune in the Loire department
 Parigny, Manche, a commune in the Manche department